Billal Zouani (born December 11, 1969 in Blida) is a retired Algerian international footballer. He played as a striker.

Club career
Zouani spent his entire career with USM Blida in the Algerian Championnat National apart from a brief stint in Finland with Atlantis FC in 2001.

International career
Zouani made 16 appearances for the Algerian National Team. He was a member of the team at the 1998 African Cup of Nations in Burkina Faso.

Career statistics

References

1969 births
Living people
People from Blida
Algerian footballers
Algerian expatriate footballers
Algeria international footballers
1998 African Cup of Nations players
Algerian Ligue Professionnelle 1 players
Atlantis FC players
Expatriate footballers in Finland
Veikkausliiga players
USM Blida players
Algerian expatriate sportspeople in Finland
Association football forwards
21st-century Algerian people